Langlibreen ("The Long Hillside Glacier") is a glacier in Nathorst Land at Spitsbergen, Svalbard. It has a length of about 4.5 kilometers, situated between the mountains of Rånekampen and Langlifjellet, and extending towards the valley of Langlidalen.

References

Glaciers of Spitsbergen